Taking liberties may be:

Taking Liberties, a compilation by Elvis Costello
Taking Liberties (film)
Taking Liberties (Frasier episode)

See also
Taking the piss
When have we eaten from the same dish?